Soft rock (also known as light rock) is a form of rock music that originated in the late 1960s in Southern California and the United Kingdom which smoothed over the edges of singer-songwriter and pop rock, relying on simple, melodic songs with big, lush productions. Soft rock was prevalent on the radio throughout the 1970s and eventually metamorphosed into a form of the synthesized music of adult contemporary in the 1980s.

History

Mid- to late 1960s
Softer sounds in rock music could be heard in mid-1960s songs, such as "A Summer Song" by Chad & Jeremy (1964) and "Here, There and Everywhere" by the Beatles and "I Love My Dog" by Cat Stevens, both from 1966.

By 1968, hard rock had been established as a mainstream genre. From the end of the 1960s, it became common to divide mainstream rock music into soft and hard rock, with both emerging as major radio formats in the US. Late 1960s soft rock artists include the Bee Gees, whose song "I Started a Joke" was a number one single in several countries; Neil Diamond with the 1969 hit "Sweet Caroline", the Hollies with their US and UK top 10 hit "He Ain't Heavy, He's My Brother", and Elton John with his popular song "Skyline Pigeon".

Early 1970s
By the early 1970s, softer songs by the Carpenters, Anne Murray, John Denver, Barry Manilow, and even Barbra Streisand began to be played more often on "top 40" radio and others were added to the mix on many adult contemporary stations.

Major artists of that time included Bread, Carly Simon, Carole King, Cat Stevens, James Taylor, Lobo and Gilbert O'Sullivan who achieved number-one hit singles between 1970–1972 with "Nothing Rhymed", "Alone Again (Naturally)" and "Clair".

The Hot 100 and Easy Listening charts became more similar again toward the end of the 1960s and into the early and mid-1970s when the texture of much of the music played on top 40 radio once more began to soften. The adult contemporary format began evolving into the sound that later defined it, with rock-oriented acts as Chicago, the Eagles and Elton John becoming associated with the format. The Carpenters' hit version of "(They Long to Be) Close to You" was released in the summer of 1970, followed by Bread's "Make It with You", both early examples of a softer sound that was coming to dominate the charts.

The soft rock album Tapestry by Carole King, released in February 1971, became one of the best-selling albums of all time. The lead double-sided single from the album, "It's Too Late"/"I Feel the Earth Move", spent five weeks at number one on the Billboard Hot 100 beginning in mid-June 1971.

Los Angeles station KNX-FM, under program director Steve Marshall, introduced a "mellow rock" format in 1971.

Albert Hammond scored a major hit single with "It Never Rains in Southern California" in 1972, which went top 10 in at least six countries including Canada and the U.S. at numbers 2 and 5, respectively.

In the spring of 1972, Neil Young scored his only number-one single with "Heart of Gold", from the album Harvest. Topping the charts in both the U.S. and Canada, this soft rock ballad featured backing vocals from Linda Ronstadt and James Taylor, heard near the end of the song.

In 1973, Paul McCartney and Wings had a U.S. number one with "My Love", which also reached No. 1 on the Adult Contemporary charts of both the U.S. and Canada.

Mid- to late 1970s

Soft rock reached its commercial peak in the mid-to-late 1970s with acts such as Toto, England Dan & John Ford Coley, Air Supply, Seals and Crofts, America and the reformed Fleetwood Mac, whose Rumours (1977) was the best-selling album of the decade.

Denver station KIMN-FM introduced a "mellow rock" album format in 1975. Program director Scott Kenyon told Billboard magazine, "Michael Murphey's 'Wildfire' is a perfect example; it feels like Colorado, you can tell it came from this part of the country. There's a sound of the Rockies... the best description is mellow rock. Take that kind of music and make it into a Colorado sounding station."

By 1977, some radio stations, notably New York's WTFM and NBC-owned WYNY, had switched to an all-soft rock format. Chicago's WBBM-FM adopted a soft rock/album rock hybrid format in 1977 and was known as "Soft Rock 96" presenting the "Mellow sound of Chicago". Five years later, they would flip to a "Hot Hits" top 40 format.

In the mid- to late 1970s, prominent soft rock acts included Billy Joel, Elton John, Jefferson Starship, Chicago, Toto, Boz Scaggs, the Alessi Brothers, Michael McDonald, Paul Davis, Eric Carmen, the Doobie Brothers, the Alan Parsons Project, Captain & Tennille, the Hollies, and Dr. Hook.

By the 1980s, tastes had changed and radio formats reflected this change, including musical artists such as Journey.

A prominent counterpart of soft rock in the late 1970s and early 1980s came to be known as yacht rock; its name coined in 2005 by the makers of the online video series Yacht Rock. Originating from California's session musicians, yacht rock only partially overlapped with soft rock; it could include soft to mid-level (but rarely ever purely hard) rock. Much of the "West Coast sound" of yacht rock bore similarity to some of the East Coast soft rockers of the era such as Rupert Holmes and Hall & Oates, leading to the conflation.

1980s
In the early 1980s, the radio format evolved into what came to be known as "adult contemporary" or "adult album alternative", a format that has less overt rock bias than its forebear radio categorization. In Los Angeles, KOST 103.5, under program director Jhani Kaye, debuted its soft adult contemporary format in November 1982. Soft rock songs still enjoyed success from artists such as Sheena Easton, Ambrosia, Lionel Richie, Christopher Cross, Dan Hill, Gino Vannelli, Leo Sayer, Air Supply, Julio Iglesias and Bertie Higgins.

Chris Norman, former lead singer of the band Smokie, scored several hits between 1986–1988 in Europe, particularly in Germany, including "Some Hearts Are Diamonds", "Broken Heroes" and "Midnight Lady", the latter reaching number one in Germany, Switzerland, and Austria.

1990s
Soft rock persisted in the 1990s, with artists from previous decades continuing to release new music, such as Genesis, whose 1992 soft rock single "Hold on My Heart" topped the Canadian singles chart and Billboard Adult Contemporary chart. Extreme's 1991 single "More Than Words" was internationally successful, topping the national singles charts in at least five countries, including Canada and the United States. Mr. Big's 1992 single "To Be with You" was a number one hit in at least twelve countries. Eric Clapton's 1992 single "Tears in Heaven" was also successful, topping the national singles charts in Canada, Ireland, New Zealand, and six other countries. 

Richard Marx's 1994 single "Now and Forever" topped the Canadian adult contemporary chart and peaked in the top ten of the national singles charts in that country, Norway, and the United States. New bands and artists emerged such as the Danish band Michael Learns to Rock, who saw massive popularity in Asia, with many singles becoming commercially successful in the continent starting with their 1991 hit "The Actor", and Australian band Southern Sons, who enjoyed success on the ARIA Charts with three top 10 singles.

See also
 Yacht rock
 Adult-oriented rock
 List of soft rock artists and songs
 Sentimental ballad

References

Bibliography

Further reading
 Kim Simpson, 2011, Early 70s Radio: The American Format Revolution 

 

 
Radio formats
1960s in music
1970s in music
1980s in music
British styles of music
British rock music genres
American styles of music
American rock music genres